Giusto de' Menabuoi (c. 1320–1391) was an Italian painter of the early Renaissance. He was born in Florence.

Probably, but not confirmed as, a pupil of Giotto, de' Menabuoi was notable for his use of bright colour and became a painter at the court of Da Carrara. Pursuing his own archaic style, far removed from Gothic style and realism of his contemporaries Altichiero and Jacopo d'Avanzi, he was to leave no trace in the development of subsequent Venetian painting.

In Lombardy he executed a fresco of the Last Judgement in the Abbey of Viboldone, Milan. He then moved to Padua where he completed frescos in the Church of the Eremitani, the Basilica of Saint Anthony of Padua and most notably at the Baptistery of the Padua Duomo.

Between 1375 and 1378 he executed the fresco decoration of the Baptistery of the Padua Duomo, commissioned by Fina Buzzaccarini, wife of Francesco I da Carrara, who intended to use the building as the family mausoleum. Compared with his earlier work, the frescoes show Romanesque and Byzantine orderliness, such as in the great Paradise of the dome, where the scene is organized around a Christ Pantocrator, surrounded by a hypnotic geometric pattern of angels and saints whose halos, arranged in neat rows, appear from below as some kind of magnificent jewellery.

Giusto de' Menabuoi died in Padua and his burial site was re-discovered outside the Baptistry.

References

1330 births
1390 deaths
14th-century Italian painters
Italian male painters
Painters from Florence
Trecento painters
Gothic painters